Franziska Petri (born 17 August 1973) is a German actress.

Biography
After ballet and vocal training in the childhood, Franziska Petri attended the Ernst Busch Academy of Dramatic Arts in Berlin from 1992 to 1995 as a singer in several bands. In addition she is a skilled milliner. During drama studies she played at the Schiller Theater. Her first television role was a guest appearance in the Wolffs Revier series in 1993. After a few other television roles she played her first film role in The Big Mambo in 1998.

To a wider audience she became known in 2000 by the lead role in Vanessa Jopp's film Forget America. There followed other leading roles, such as 2001 in Joseph Vilsmaier's film Leo and Claire, in 2006 alongside Hanna Schygulla in the ARD TV movie The Unclean Time or in the films The Day I met my Dead Husband, Shadow World and For Miriam.

Honors
For her leading role in the Russian feature film Betrayal, Petri was honored as the best actress at the Abu Dhabi Film Festival in 2012.

In 2017 she received the Best Actress award for portraying Sonja in Platonow at the VIFF Vienna Independent Film Festival.

Personal life
She was married to her long-time co-star Uwe Kockisch from 1995 to 2005.

In 2010 she had her first child.

Selected filmography

References

External links 

 
 

Living people
1973 births
21st-century German actresses
20th-century German actresses
German film actresses
German television actresses
Actors from Leipzig